Amatnatua is a hamlet in Highland, Scotland.

Populated places in Ross and Cromarty